Knighton Community Centre is a venue situated in the Powys border town of Knighton.  Following an extensive refurbishment in 2017, it has become a hub for a wide range of services, including:
 District Library in partnership with Powys County Council
 Community Hub including Tuesday and Thursday Drop Ins 
 Youth Work Project in partnership with Knighton Town Council
 Volunteer Centre in partnership with PAVO
 Family Centre and Stay and Play 
 Cohesion and diversity work such as the film Knighton is my home 
 Community Market and shopping events
 Digital Hub / Business Centre in partnership with Powys County Council
 Knighton Festival
 Live music and theatre 

 
The Community Centre is a base for services such as the Knighton and Presteigne Leg Club, the Bracken Trust and the RNID (Cymru) Hearing Clinic. The Community Connector who works for Powys Association of Voluntary Organisations (PAVO) is also based here.

It offers facilities for hire and has a hall and stage, bar area, kitchen, small meeting room and medium sized meeting room and provides a base for Karate, Teme Spirits,Dance, Fitness, children's activities, weddings and private parties.

References

 Knighton Community Centre

Buildings and structures in Powys
Community centres in Wales
Knighton, Powys